Nicholas (Nick) Horton is an American statistics professor and author. He is the Beitzel Professor in Technology and Society at Amherst College. As of 2022, he will serve as the vice president of the American Statistical Association.

Education 
Horton completed his A.B. at Harvard College and his Sc.D. at the Harvard School of Public Health.

Work 
Horton has written multiple books focusing on R and SAS. He is also an author in the fields of statistics education and missing data. He is one of the authors of the GAISE guidelines. With Ben Baumer and Daniel Kaplan, he is the author of Modern Data Science with R. Other notable works include:

 Normal Sexual Dimorphism of the Adult Human Brain Assessed by In Vivo Magnetic Resonance Imaging 
 Much ado about nothing: A comparison of missing data methods and software to fit incomplete data regression models
He is an editor for the Journal of Statistics and Data Science Education (JSDSE).

Awards 
Fellow of the American Statistical Association.

Fellow of the American Association for the Advancement of Science.

Personal life
Horton resides in Northampton, Massachusetts with his wife, Julia Riseman. The two are advocates for bicycle trails.

References 

Living people
Year of birth missing (living people)
Harvard College alumni
Harvard School of Public Health alumni
Fellows of the American Statistical Association
Fellows of the American Association for the Advancement of Science
Amherst College faculty
R (programming language) people